Gulshanabad is a neighborhood of  Rawalpindi, (Punjab, Pakistan).

The suburb is situated on Adyala Road of Rawalpindi, Adyala Road leads to the infamous Adyala Jail. The colony was settled in late 80's and contains 4 sectors and has a central market along with a central green area park and a Central Mosque (Jamia Masjid).

Populated places in Rawalpindi District